Parviz Abdullayev (nicknamed Cobra Parviz; born January 5, 1986) — professional Azerbaijani kickboxer, honored Sport Master of Azerbaijan, six-time world champion in professional kickboxing.

Early life 
Parviz Abdullayev was born in Azerbaijan, Aghdam, on January 5, 1986. He had his early education in Agdam then graduated from middle school No. 250 in Baku. In 2003 he got admitted into the Faculty of History at Baku State University.

In 2010 Parviz Abdullayev was declared as one of the top 10 athletes of the year in Azerbaijan.

Parviz Abdullayev was rewarded with a new apartment for his success in sport by President of Azerbaijan, Ilham Aliyev. Parviz Abdullayev has been leading his "Cobra" kickboxing club since 2011.

He is a contributor at Sport Healthy Centre of Ministry of Ministry of Emergency Situations since 2013. He represents Gabala Sport Club. He is married and has 2 sons. He is training his son Yusif in boxing.

Professional career 
He began training martial art at the age of twelve (1997) starting with kung fu.  	

Starting his professional sport career in 2007, Parviz Abdullayev became champion of Azerbaijan in the martial art of Wushu-sanshou in 2007–08.

In 2007 he took second place in Wushu-sanshou in the World Cup competition which took place in China. In those years he simultaneously began to participate in kickboxing fights.

In 2009 he won 5 fights in kickboxing competitions and won the title of World Champion in the 71 kg weight class which organized by WAKO countries in Villach, Austria.

In 2010 he participated at "World Accord Combat Games 2010" held in Beijing, China and became the champion.

In May 2010 he participated at World Cup games in WAKO Kickboxing competition held in Hungary and took second place.

In 2010 Parviz Abdullayev defeated Russian rival Vladimir Shulyak WAKO European Championship held in Baku, Azerbaijan. He became World Champion and was awarded the world belt.

He started training at "Super Pro" club of Netherlands by his master Dennis Ravel in 2011. In 2011 he participated in a competition held in Rostov-on-Don, Russia among professionals and became World Champion for the second time.

In 2013 Azerbaijani kickboxer defeated his rival Vitaliy Soroka for the sake of R1 World's Belt and became world Champion held in Rostov, Russia. In 2014 he defeated rival from Morocco at IPCC kickboxing competitions and again obtained world Champion title, was awarded the world's belt.

In 2014 the kickboxer defeated his Romanian rival and got "Haydar Aliyev Belt" at a tournament dedicated to national leader Heydar Aliyev’s 90th anniversary held in Vienna.

In 2017 he took third place in Wushu-Sanda at the 4th Islamic Solidarity Games in Baku, Azerbaijan.

In 2018 he participated in ACB KB professional kickboxing tournament in Moscow. He defeated his Chechen opponent kickboxer from Russia. Parviz Abdullayev became world Champion and the first time was awarded ACB fight belt.

Parviz Abdullayev has participated in fights promoted by Glory, SUPERKOMBAT and Kunlun Fight.

Parviz’s trainer is a 2 times World Champion Fizuli Musayev and is the personal trainer of Mehman Umudov.

Awards and honours 
2007 – Azerbaijan Champion to wushu-Sanshou
2007 – the world Cup, 2nd-place to Wushu-sanshou
2009 – World Campion to Kickboxing WAKO
2010 – winner "World Accord Combat Games 2010"
2010 – the world cup, 2nd place to kickboxing WAKO
2010 – World Campion, World Belt to kickboxing WAKO PRO
2011 - World Campion, World Belt to kickboxing WAKO PRO
2013 – world champion, world belt, R1
2014 – World Champion, World Belt to IPCC Kickboxing
2014 – "Heydar Aliyev Belt"
2017 – IV Islamic Solidarity Games, 2nd place
2018 – ACB Fight Belt

Fight record (incomplete)

|-  style="background:#cfc;"
| 2017-01-01 || Win ||align=left| Law Chosing || Kunlun Fight 56 || Sanya, Hainan, China || Decision || 1 || 4:10
|- style="background:#fbb"
| 2016-9-24 || Loss ||align=left|  Zhang Yang || Kunlun Fight 53 || Beijing, China || Decision (Unanimous) || 3 || 3:00
|-  style="background:#fbb;"
| 2016-04-08 || Loss ||align=left| Diogo Calado || Kunlun Fight 41 - 75 kg Tournament Final 16 || Xining, China || Decision || 3 || 3:00
|-  style="background:#fbb;"
| 2016-03-25 || Loss ||align=left| Martin Gano || Kunlun Fight 40 - 70 kg World Max 2016 Qualifier Tournament || Tongling, China || Decision || 1 || 4:10
|-  style="background:#cfc;"
| 2016-02-21 || Win ||align=left| Nuerla Mulali || Kunlun Fight 38 || Pattaya, Thailand || Decision || 3 || 3:00
|-  style="background:#cfc;"
| 2015-12-04 || Win ||align=left| Aziz Kallah || Glory 26: Amsterdam || Amsterdam, Netherlands || Decision (unanimous) || 3 || 3:00
|-  style="background:#fbb;"
| 2015-09-04 || Loss ||align=left| Nuerla Mulali || Kunlun Fight 30 || Zhoukou, China || Decision || 3 || 3:00
|-  style="background:#cfc;"
| 2015-07-19 || Win ||align=left| Zhang Zhaoguan || Kunlun Fight 28 || Nanjing, China || Decision || 3 || 3:00
|-  style="background:#cfc;"
| 2015-05-02 || Win ||align=left| Alexandru Popescu || Kunlun Fight 24 || Verona, Italy || KO || 1 ||
|-  style="background:#cfc;"
| 2014-08-24 || Win ||align=left| Zheng Zhaoyu || Kunlun Fight 8 || Xining, China || Decision || 3 || 3:00
|-  style="background:#cfc;"
| 2013-05-10 || Win ||align=left| Gabriel Bozan || Superkombat New Heroes 3 || Vienna, Austria || Decision (unanimous) || 3 || 3:00
|-

References

External links
Pərviz Abdullayev peşəkarlar arasında dünya kəmərinə sahib olub
Dünya çempionu Pərviz Abdullayev: “Artıq şou vaxtıdı” 
Vyanada ümummilli lider Heydər Əliyevin 90 illik yubileyinə həsr olunmuş beynəlxalq kikboksinq turniri keçirilmişdir 
Pərviz Abdullayev: İdmançının reklamı güclü olmalıdır – Foto 
Pərviz Abdullayev: "Hamı məni "kobra" kimi tanıyır" - MÜSAHİBƏ 
Pərviz Abdullayev: "Ermənilər mənimlə döyüşdə məğlub olacaqlarını əvvəlcədən bilib, döyüşmədilər" 

Azerbaijani male kickboxers
1986 births
Living people
People from Agdam District
SUPERKOMBAT kickboxers
Kunlun Fight kickboxers
Survivor Turkey contestants